The 1962 U.S. National Championships (now known as the US Open) was a tennis tournament that took place on the outdoor grass courts at the West Side Tennis Club, Forest Hills in New York City, United States. The tournament ran from 29 August until 10 September. It was the 82nd staging of the U.S. National Championships, and the fourth Grand Slam tennis event of 1962. The men's singles event was won by Australian Rod Laver whose victory completed his first Grand Slam.

Finals

Men's singles

 Rod Laver defeated  Roy Emerson  6–2, 6–4, 5–7, 6–4

Women's singles

 Margaret Smith defeated  Darlene Hard  9–7, 6–4

Men's doubles
 Rafael Osuna /  Antonio Palafox defeated  Chuck McKinley /  Dennis Ralston 6–4, 10–12, 1–6, 9–7, 6–3

Women's doubles
 Maria Bueno /  Darlene Hard  defeated  Karen Hantze Susman /  Billie Jean Moffitt, 4–6, 6–3, 6–2

Mixed doubles
 Margaret Smith /  Fred Stolle defeated  Lesley Turner /  Frank Froehling 7–5, 6–2

References

External links
Official US Open website

 
U.S. National Championships
U.S. National Championships (tennis) by year
U.S. National Championships (tennis)
U.S. National Championships (tennis)
U.S. National Championships (tennis)